Robert Michael Lally (born February 12, 1952) is a former American football linebacker who played in the National Football League (NFL) and the World Football League (WFL).  Lally played collegiate ball for Cornell University and served as team captain.  He was a First-team Selection to the Silver Anniversary All-Ivy Football Team (1971), a Cornell Hall of Fame Inductee (1982) and was selected to the Cornell All-Time Football Team (1887–2003). At Cornell, Lally was also President of the Red Key Society and was a member of the Quill and Dagger Society.  He played prep football for Bergen Catholic High School in Oradell, New Jersey, where he was inducted into the Hall of Fame (1991).

Lally was drafted by the Miami Dolphins in the 1974 NFL Draft and the Memphis Southmen of the WFL. He signed with the Southmen where he was the '75 team captain and played MLB with teammates Larry Csonka, Jim Kiick, Paul Warfield, Danny White, and John Huarte for the two years the league existed (1974-1975). In 1976, Lally signed with the NFL's Green Bay Packers.   Lally played for the Packers for one season, in 1976.

References

External links
Just Sports Stats

1952 births
Living people
Sportspeople from Hoboken, New Jersey
Players of American football from New Jersey
American football linebackers
Bergen Catholic High School alumni
Cornell Big Red football players
Memphis Southmen players
Green Bay Packers players